John Bonomy (11 March 1918 – 27 June 1980) was a Scottish amateur football right back who played in the Scottish League for Queen's Park. He was capped by Scotland at amateur level.

References 

Association football fullbacks
Scottish footballers
Queen's Park F.C. players
Scottish Football League players
Scotland amateur international footballers
1918 births
1980 deaths
Footballers from Motherwell
Royal Albert F.C. players
Motherwell F.C. players
Partick Thistle F.C. wartime guest players
Raith Rovers F.C. players
Carluke Rovers F.C. players
People from the Isle of Arran